Launched in 2001, Word Travels has become one of the most popular independent series of travel guides available on the internet. The guides were originally developed for use within travel agencies, offering travel consultants information on thousands of worldwide destinations. Word Travels makes most of its content available online, offering guides to more than 1000 worldwide destinations, from Azerbaijan to Zurich. A key feature of the site is the Word Travels Forum, where travellers questions get answered by travel professionals within each destination. Word Travels produces the travel guides found on many of the most popular airline, hotel and travel agency websites.

The Word Travels guides are now available as iPhone Apps and on the Kindle store.

Word Travels is published by Globe Media Limited, a privately held company with offices in both London and Cape Town. Globe Media also produces the Expat Arrivals city guides, which are used widely within the relocation industry and are relied upon as a vital source of information by their clients.

References 
Agents offered informative selling tool - Travelmole
100 best travel websites - The Times

External links
 wordtravels.com
 expatarrivals.com
 wordtravels.com/forum

Travel guide books
South African travel websites